The 1942 Pacific Tigers football team represented the College of the Pacific—now known as the University of the Pacific—in Stockton, California as a member of the Far Western Conference (FWC) during the 1942 college football season. Led by tenth-year head coach Amos Alonzo Stagg, Pacific compiled an overall record of 2–6–1 with a mark of 2–0 in conference play, winning the FWC title. The team was outscored by its opponents 141 to 58 for the season and was shut out in five games. The Tigers played home games at Baxter Stadium in Stockton.

Schedule

Notes

References

Pacific
Pacific Tigers football seasons
Northern California Athletic Conference football champion seasons
Pacific Tigers football